Coming Alive may refer to:

Coming Alive (Casey Darnell album)
Coming Alive (Chimaira video album)
"Coming Alive", a song by Phil Wickham from the album Heaven & Earth